Dicrostonychini is a tribe of lemmings in the subfamily Arvicolinae. It contains only one extant genus, as well as one extinct genus.

A 2021 study found Dicrostonychini to also include the genera previously placed in the tribe Phenacomyini, and found this combined Dicrostonychini to be the sister group to the muskrats (tribe Ondatrini).

References

 
Voles and lemmings
Taxa named by Miklós Kretzoi
Mammal tribes